Veterans Memorial Boulevard, formerly Veterans Highway (locally referred to as Vets or Veterans), is a 6-lane thoroughfare in Jefferson Parish, Louisiana, and Orleans Parish, Louisiana, running west–east mostly parallel to Interstate 10.  The western terminus is at Belleview Boulevard in Kenner just north of the Louis Armstrong New Orleans International Airport and just east of the St. Charles Parish line.  Veterans then proceeds in an easterly direction across the Jefferson Parish communities of Kenner and Metairie before crossing the 17th Street Canal into New Orleans and terminating at West End Boulevard approximately 1/2 mile east of the Orleans Parish line.

Veterans is primarily a commercial corridor lined with malls such as Lakeside Shopping Center and Clearview Mall, strip shopping centers and car dealers.  During Carnival season, several Mardi Gras parades roll along portions of Veterans as they wind through the streets of Metairie. Beginning in 1978, the Jefferson Parish Council adopted a standardized parade route for Metairie, which began at the Clearview Shopping Center and rolled east along Veterans before disbanding at Bonnabel Boulevard. In 2019, the council started allowing krewes the option of parading westbound from Bonnabel to Clearview. 

Veterans Memorial Boulevard is dedicated to the memory of all veterans.

References

Transportation in Jefferson Parish, Louisiana
Roads in Louisiana
Boulevards in the United States